The Ohio Farmer was an agricultural newspaper established by Thomas Brown in Cleveland, Ohio in the mid-1800s. It was a weekly publication centered on farm and family life and provided sections for farming, housekeeping, and for children.

As proclaimed in its header, The Ohio Farmer was "devoted to the improvement and betterment of the farmer, his family, and farm." The Ohio Farmer is part of the Farm Progress family of newspapers.

Contributors
 Helen Louisa Bostwick Bird

References

External links
Chronicling America: Ohio Farmer
Illinois Digital Newspaper Collections: The Ohio Farmer

Defunct newspapers published in Cleveland
1848 establishments in Ohio
Publications established in 1848